Alfred Mensah (born 8 August 1999) is a Ghanaian professional footballer who currently play as a centre-forward for Israeli club Hapoel Nof HaGalil.

References

1999 births
Living people
People from Eastern Region (Ghana)
Ghanaian footballers
Association football forwards
KF Skënderbeu Korçë players
Hapoel Nof HaGalil F.C. players
Kategoria Superiore players
Liga Leumit players
Expatriate footballers in Albania
Expatriate footballers in Israel
Ghanaian expatriate sportspeople in Albania
Ghanaian expatriate sportspeople in Israel